Tracy Weber (died 1981) was an American singer, best known for her dance hit "Sure Shot", released in late 1981 after her death. Nicky Braddy and Richard Bassoff co-wrote the song for Weber to sing, as Braddy and Weber had known each other growing up in Queens.

"Sure Shot" was produced as a 12-inch disco single by Eric Matthew and Gary Turnier, but shortly before the single was released, Weber was shot and killed in an apartment in Harlem, New York City. The song reached number 3 on the Billboard Disco Top 60 chart in February 1982. "Sure Shot" was popular in dance clubs, listed in San Francisco as one of the top 25 dance club records of 1981–1982, and played by Larry Levan in New York City who released his own dance mix of the song. In France, Le Figaro praised "Sure Shot" as a summer dance hit and said Weber was a charming young lady with a "voice of fire".

Discography

Singles

References

1981 deaths
Date of death missing
Singers from New York City
20th-century African-American women singers
Murdered African-American people
American murder victims
People murdered in New York City
Deaths by firearm in New York (state)
20th-century American singers
20th-century American women singers
People from St. Albans, Queens
Deaths by firearm in Manhattan
1981 murders in the United States